Alexander Petrovich Koroviakov (November 16, 1912 – June 12, 1993) was a Soviet, Russian painter and art teacher, lived and worked in Leningrad – Saint Petersburg, a member of the Saint Petersburg Union of Artists (before 1992 the Leningrad branch of Union of Artists of Russian Federation), regarded as a representative of the Leningrad school of painting.

Biography 

Koroviakov was born November 16, 1912, in Berdskaya, near Orenburg, Orenburg Province, Russian Empire.

In 1932 Alexander Koroviakov entered to the Fine Art College (Penza). After graduating he comes to Leningrad and continued his study at Leningrad Institute of Painting, Sculpture and Architecture named after Ilya Repin since 1937. He studied with Boris Fogel, Genrikh Pavlovsky, and Semion Abugov.

In 1941, July, Alexander Koroviakov has gone to the Red Army as a volunteer from the last academic year. Не took part in Volhovsky Front, in the battles for Leningrad, in the liberation of Baltic states. Не was wounded and demobilized as a sergeant in 1945. Alexander Koroviakov was awarded by an Order of the Red Star, the Medal "For the Victory over Germany in the Great Patriotic War 1941–1945" and the Medal "For the Defence of Leningrad".

At September, 1945, Alexander Koroviakov resumed his study in the Leningrad Institute of Painting, Sculpture and Architecture named after Ilya Repin and graduated from Rudolf Frentz workshop in 1947. His degree work was a "Wounded Commander". 
In 1947 he came back to Penza for teaching painting and drawing in Fine Art College.

Since 1949 Alexander Koroviakov has participated in Art Exhibitions. He painted portraits, landscapes, still lifes, genre paintings. Most famous for his still life paintings and cityscapes of Leningrad.

In the 1954 Alexander Koroviakov returned to Leningrad and start to teach painting and drawing in the famous Leningrad Secondary Art School under the Academy of Arts of the USSR, where he worked until 1983.

Alexander Koroviakov was very active in the exhibition life of Leningrad. 
In 1956 he took part at Autumn exhibition (Leningrad, 1956) where he demonstrated the works: "The First Snow" and "The Palace Square" (both 1956). He designated his main direction of the creation: Leningrad cityscape from this moment. His basic technique was working directly from life. 
Among his works there were "Spring in Leningrad", "St. Isaak's Square", "Near the Pier" (all 1957), "Kronwerk Strait" (1960), "Stadium under the name of Lenin", "Lenin Street", "Factory District" (all 1960), "At the Islands", "After the Snowfall", "Leningrad" (all 1962), "Wet Asphalt" (1963), "Winter Palace", "Near Peter and Paul Fortress" (both 1965), "On the Nevka River" (1964) and many others.
Besides the Leningrad motifs Alexander Koroviakov also worked on tradition landscape. He preferred intimate subjects: a corner of autumn garden or snow-covered yard, sparkling of light spots on the water. For example, in the works "Autumn Garden" (1965) and "At the Seliger Lake" (1965).
In 1960-1980 Alexander Koroviakov was keen by theme of Still life. His compositions were original, complicated by their technique and had associative content. Like in "Autumn Still life" (1972), "Dog Rose" (1969), "Still life with Cabbage" (1972),"Bouquet" (1979).
Alexander Koroviakov experimented a lot on painting technique, he tended to effects of capacity, semitransparency and polycoating of image. 
In 1989 -1992 his works were presented at auctions and exhibitions of Russian paintings at France with great successes.

Alexander Koroviakov was a member of the Leningrad Union of Soviet Artists since 1955.

Alexander Petrovich Koroviakov died on June 12, 1993, in Saint Petersburg at the eighty-first year of life. His paintings reside in Art museums and private collections in Russia, Japan, in the U.S., China, France, and throughout the world.

See also
 Leningrad School of Painting
 List of painters of Saint Petersburg Union of Artists
 List of the Russian Landscape painters
 Saint Petersburg Union of Artists

References

 Bibliography 
 Центральный Государственный Архив литературы и искусства. СПб. Ф.78. Оп.8.ч.2. Д.309.
 Осенняя выставка произведений ленинградских художников. 1956 года. Каталог. Л., Ленинградский художник, 1958. С.14.
 1917—1957. Выставка произведений ленинградских художников. Каталог. Л., Ленинградский художник, 1958. С. 18.
 Осенняя выставка произведений ленинградских художников 1958 года. Каталог. Л., Художник РСФСР, 1959. С.15.
 Выставка произведений ленинградских художников 1960 года. Каталог. Л., Художник РСФСР, 1963. С.11.
 Выставка произведений ленинградских художников 1960 года. Каталог. Л., Художник РСФСР, 1961. С.22.
 Осенняя выставка произведений ленинградских художников 1962 года. Каталог. Л., Художник РСФСР, 1962. С.15.
 Ленинград. Зональная выставка. Л., Художник РСФСР, 1965. С.27.
 Каталог весенней выставки произведений ленинградских художников 1965 года. Л., Художник РСФСР, 1970. С.17.
 Каталог произведений художников Российской Федерации, переданных в дар организациям и учреждениям культуры (1963—1971 гг.). М., СХ РСФСР, 1972. С.51.
 Справочник членов Союза художников СССР. Т.1. М., Советский художник, 1979. С.540.
 Выставки советского изобразительного искусства. Справочник. Т.5. 1954—1958 годы. М., Советский художник, 1981. С.57, 259, 386, 348, 571.
 Справочник членов Ленинградской организации Союза художников РСФСР. Л., Художник РСФСР, 1987. С.62.
 Peinture Russe. Catalogue. Paris, Drouot Richelieu, 18 Fevrier 1991. Р.7,23—24.
 Sots’Art a St Petersbourg. Catalogue. St Germain en Laye, 23 Fevrier 1992. Р.6.
 Выставка произведений художников — участников Великой Отечественной войны Санкт-Петербургского Союза художников России. СПб., ПСХ, 1993. С.3.
 Ленинградские художники. Живопись 1950—1980 годов. Каталог. СПб., Выставочный центр ПСХ, 1994. С.3.
 Этюд в творчестве ленинградских художников. Выставка произведений. Каталог. СПб., Мемориальный музей Н. А. Некрасова, 1994. С.4.
 Лирика в произведениях художников военного поколения. Выставка произведений. Каталог. СПб., Мемориальный музей Н. А. Некрасова, 1995. С.4.
 Живопись 1940—1990 годов. Ленинградская школа. Выставка произведений. СПб., Мемориальный музей Н. А. Некрасова, 1996. С.3.
 Натюрморт в живописи 1940—1990 годов. Ленинградская школа. Каталог выставки. СПб., Мемориальный музей Н. А. Некрасова, 1997. С.3.
 Мы помним… Художники, искусствоведы — участники Великой Отечественной войны. М., Союз художников России, 2000. С.145.
 Sergei V. Ivanov. Unknown Socialist Realism. The Leningrad School. Saint Petersburg: NP-Print Edition, 2007. P.9, 18, 21, 27, 54, 300, 336, 342, 345, 346, 349, 362, 387, 390—396, 403—405, 431. , 
 Юбилейный Справочник выпускников Санкт-Петербургского академического института живописи, скульптуры и архитектуры имени И. Е. Репина Российской Академии художеств. 1915—2005. СПб., «Первоцвет», 2007. С.58.
 Коровяков А. П. Стадион Ленина'' // 80 лет Санкт-Петербургскому Союзу художников. Юбилейная выставка. СПб., «Цветпринт», 2012. С.204.

1912 births
1993 deaths
20th-century Russian painters
Russian male painters
Soviet painters
Soviet military personnel of World War II
Socialist realist artists
Russian landscape painters
Members of the Leningrad Union of Artists
Leningrad School artists
Repin Institute of Arts alumni
20th-century Russian male artists